Babou Nicolai Nelson Lowe (born 7 December 1994), better known by his mononym Babou, is a Danish singer of mixed Danish-Gambian origin. He came third in Danish X Factor in 2011. He has released one album and his single "Supernova" has charted in Denmark, becoming the theme song for season 10 of the Danish version of the reality television series Paradise Hotel.

Beginnings
Babou was born to a Gambian father and a Danish mother. He started very early in music. In the year 2005, only ten years old, he participated in the talent show Scenen er din broadcast on TV 2 coming second for the category "Junior Song".<ref>[http://www.billedbladet.dk/kendte/danmark/nu-gaar-babou-fra-x-factor-efter-guldet 'Billedbladet: Nu går Babou fra X Factor efter guldet – I 2005 fik Babou, der dengang var 10 år, en andenplads i Scenen er din. Nu er han lige fyldt 16 og går målrettet efter at vinde X Factor] </ref> Gaining huge popularity, he released an album of covers titled For Once in My Life.

He was just 12 when his mother, who had been diagnosed with an ongoing mental illness, finally opted to put the young Babou in foster care with foster parents residing in Aarhus.

In X Factor
In 2011, at age 16, he took part in season 4 of the Danish version of the competition The X Factor broadcast on Danish television channel DR1, from 1 January to 25 March 2011 auditioning as a contestant from Aarhus with the song "Cry Me Out" from Pixie Lott. He was put through with the three judges, Cutfather, Pernille Rosendahl and Thomas Blachman. Reaching the Final 9 stage, he was mentored by Cutfather in the "Under 25" category.

Performances during the live shows included:

Despite heavy speculation he would win the title, he finished third overall, with 26.23% of the popular vote in the Final 3 stage, to winner Sarah Skaalum Jørgensen (or just the mononym Sarah) and runner-up Annelouise.Politiken: 15-årige Sarah vinder tæt finale – Sarah og Annelouise kæmpede til det sidste i X Factor 

After X Factor
After staying away a couple of years, Babou came back with a single "Supernova" that has charted on Hitlisten, the official Danish Singles Chart entering the chart at number 8 in its first week of release.

"Supernova" had been written as a promotional theme song for the Danish reality television series Paradise Hotel'' in its tenth season in 2014. Footage of the venue used for the program as well as some of the participants on the show was used in a music video released for the song.

Dansk Melodi Grand Prix

In 2015, took part in Dansk Melodi Grand Prix in a bid to represent Denmark in the Eurovision Song Contest 2015 with the song "Manjana". He came 5th with 57 points.

Discography

Albums

Singles

References

External links
YouTube VEVO page
DR1 – X Factor Babou page

1994 births
Living people
X Factor (Danish TV series) contestants
Danish people of Gambian descent
Singers  from Aarhus
21st-century Danish male  singers